Sakandelidze is a Georgian surname. Notable people with the surname include:

Karlo Sakandelidze (1928–2010), Georgian actor
Zurab Sakandelidze (1945–2004), Georgian basketball player

Georgian-language surnames